Gonatodes machelae is a species of lizard in the family Sphaerodactylidae. The species is endemic to Margarita Island in Venezuela.

References

Gonatodes
Reptiles described in 2020
Lizards of the Caribbean
Reptiles of Venezuela